Attract China LLC is an American tourism company that helps U.S. businesses promote their hotels, restaurants, retail stores, attractions and deals to Chinese tourists, the fastest-growing and highest-spending tourist segment in the U.S., through digital platforms and printed guides. Attract China also markets to Chinese college students, who comprised the largest segment of foreign students attending the top 25 U.S. schools hosting international students during the 2012–2013 academic year.

Attract China is headquartered in Boston, Massachusetts and operates a Chinese-language website in Beijing, China.

History 

Attract China, headquartered in Boston, MA and with operations in Beijing, China, was co-founded by Evan Saunders and Sam Goodman in 2011. Saunders serves as the Attract China’s CEO and Goodman is president of the company.

Operations 

Attract China is focused on connecting American businesses, including hotels, restaurants, retailers and attractions, with independent Chinese travelers, the fastest-growing and highest-spending tourist segment in the U.S., through digital platforms and guides in Mandarin. Attract China also markets to Chinese college students, who comprised the largest segment of foreign students attending the top 25 U.S. schools hosting international students during the 2012–2013 academic year.

Attract China initially operated in seven U.S. markets, including New York, NY; Boston, MA; Las Vegas, NV; Los Angeles, CA; and San Francisco, CA. In 2014, the company expanded to Seattle, WA; Chicago, IL; and Hawaii. Also during 2014, the company announced plans to add five more markets before the end of the year. Attract China also operates a Chinese-language website in Beijing, China. The company generates revenue through advertisements placed in various marketing vehicles by client brands.

Clients 

Attract China currently works with some 300 clients in North America including The Ritz-Carlton, Mandarin Oriental Hotel Group, Sonesta Collection, Westin Hotels and Resorts, Stuart Weitzman, Samsonite, and Premium Outlets.

Products

Xiao Yao Dao online portal 

Xiao Yao Dao, which translates to "The Gateway for Getaway," is a China-based Chinese-language destination portal operated by Attract China. The portal provides Chinese tourists with travel information about hotels, restaurants, retailers, attractions, and special deals in the U.S.

Chinese-language maps 

Attract China creates and provides maps in Chinese for each American city in which it operates. The passport-sized foldout maps feature restaurants, tours, attractions, shops, services and more, along with a map of the city and its public transit system.

References

American companies established in 2011
Retail companies established in 2011
Transport companies established in 2011
Travel and holiday companies of the United States
Companies based in Boston
City guides